Colpocoryphe is a genus of trilobites in the family Calymenidae.

Morphology
 Convex Cephalon
 Trapezoidal glabellae, frequently distinctly furrowed and surelevated compared to the axis.
 Dorsal furrows slightly convergent forwardly with almost linear anterior parts.
 Broad dorsal furrows, deep and not well defined.
 3, rather 4, well defined lateral furrows
 Librigenæ without lateral area or lateral furrow.
 Preglabellar field very short, downward oriented.
 Inflated occipital ring with smooth lateral ends.
 Occipital furrow broad and deep.
 Eye ridges rather weak.
 Anterior cephalic notch marked, with frequently parallel edges.
 Thorax : Strongly convex axis.
 Triangular Pygidium
 Convex axis, with segmentation well defined.
 6 - 8 axial rings.
 Pleurae with deep border furrows.
 Axis extending nearly to posterior margin (large posterior terminal piece), connected to
 it by short postaxial ridge.
 Pleural fields behind articulating half-ribs nearly smooth, with 2 - 3 very indistinct ribs.
 Wide border distinctly set off by marked change in convexity.

References

Calymenidae
Phacopida genera
Ordovician trilobites
Silurian trilobites
Fossils of the Czech Republic
Letná Formation
Fossils of France
Fezouata Formation fossils